Ōpōtiki District is a territorial authority district on the North Island of New Zealand. The Ōpōtiki District Council is headquartered in the largest town, Ōpōtiki. The district falls within the Bay of Plenty Region. Lyn Riesterer has been the mayor of Ōpōtiki since the 2019 local elections.

The district has an area of 3101 square kilometres, of which 3090 square kilometres are land.

Council history
The Whakatane County Council established in 1876 included Ōpōtiki. Opotiki became a Town District in 1882. Opotiki County separated from Whakatane County in 1899 or 1900, and Opotiki town became a borough in 1908 or 1911. The borough and county merged in 1973. In the 1989 local government reforms, some parts of Opotiki became part of Whakatane District again.

Geography
The district is predominantly steep hills dissected by fast-flowing rivers, the largest being the Motu. The coastal riverine floodplains (‘flats’) and terraces (‘tablelands’) provide the only flat land. Ōpōtiki township is situated on the largest flat at the conjunction of two of these, the Otara River and the Waioeka River. Sandy beaches, lower hills and larger flats are characteristic of the southwest area of the district; pebbly or rocky beaches and high hills coming right down to the sea are characteristic of the northeast. Current human population is therefore concentrated in the coastal southwest.

Geology

Geologically the district is predominantly greywacke of Late Jurassic to Late Cretaceous age, draped by wind-blown loess during the Pleistocene Ice Ages and more recently covered in volcanic ash and pumice from the Rotorua and Taupō volcanic centres. The active volcano Whakaari/White Island lies offshore and represents a tsunami risk. Earthquakes are also a risk, but the district lies just off to the east of major fault lines and the risk is less than in other nearby areas. There are no valuable mineral resources, although the greywacke contains rare decapitated guyots which have been mined in the past for gold and copper.

Botany
Natural vegetation is preserved in many parts of the district because of the unsuitability of steep land for cultivation. The district is at a natural geographic and climatic boundary. It is the southern limit for mangroves (Avicennia resinifera) on this side of the North Island of New Zealand, the southern limit for the coastal tree taraire (Beilschmiedia taraire), and the mountains are the furthest north for many New Zealand alpine plants (Ranunculus insignis, Ourisia caespitosa etc.). A remnant sea-level stand of an alpine southern beech (Nothofagus solandri) exists at the head of Ohiwa Harbour, a drowned Ice Ages valley system.

Coastal forest consists of pōhutukawa trees, nikau palms, and many small shrubs belonging to genera such as Pseudopanax, Coprosma etc. Of particular note are a daisy-flowered shrub Olearia pachyphylla endemic to the district, and the rare large-flowered broom Carmichaelia williamsii.

Further inland is temperate rainforest. The canopy is dominated by tall trees such as tawa, puriri and pukatea heavily populated by epiphytes (ferns, lily and orchid families) and lianas which include a pandanaceous climber (kiekie). The understory contains many ferns of various sizes including tree ferns up to 10 m high, the giant stinging nettle Urtica ferox and the extremely poisonous tutu shrub.

In mountainous areas the rainforest gives way to less dense Nothofagus beech forest. The understory is dominated by Gahnia sedges with sparse shrubs such as the foul-smelling Coprosma foetidissima. Above the treeline there is tough-leaved Olearia shrub and alpine herbfield. The diminutive alpine tutu shrub Coriaria pottsiana is endemic to the district.

The lower river valleys and adjacent tablelands provide productive farming areas whilst exotic plantings for commercial timber (mainly pinus radiata) occur on the fringes of the hill country.

Zoology
Introduced animal species considered to be pests (deer, pig, goat, possum) are common in the forested areas and feral sheep and cattle can be found as ‘escapees’ from adjacent farmland. In the developed areas, birdlife is a mix of introduced pastoral species from Britain (blackbird, song thrush, various finches, sparrows, pheasant, mallard duck), California quail, and native species such as tūī, fantail, grey warbler, waxeye, kingfisher, pūkeko.

In the forested areas the birdlife is mainly native species which in addition to the above include wood pigeon (kererū), blue duck (whio), bellbird, morepork (native owl). In the past the rare North Island kōkako (a blue-wattled bird) has been sighted.

Indigenous freshwater fish, apart from eels, are all small species and are caught as ‘whitebait’ in season. Introduced trout are found in some rivers. The district is rich in sea life such as molluscs (pipi, tuatua, kina, scallop), crayfish, edible fish such as snapper, kahawai and gurnard. Commercial aquaculture is beginning (mussel, oyster).

History and culture

Early Māori history
The first known inhabitants of the district were probably members of the Tini o Toi people, who apparently derived from the Tākitimu waka which came to the Whakatāne area from Taranaki. There followed, perhaps a few generations later, the Tainui and Te Arawa people, from the first of which the present Ngaitai tribe claim direct descent. Also in this period were migrations by the Nukutere waka from Taranaki, and the Rangimatoru waka.

Several more generations later, the Mātaatua people arrived at Whakatāne from a place called Parinuitera, which could be either Young Nick's Head or a place on Ahuahu (Great Mercury Island). The present-day Te Whakatōhea and Te Whānau-ā-Apanui iwi claim descent from the intermarriage of Mātaatua with earlier migrants. The overland migration called Te Heke o Te Rangihouhiri, which eventually resulted in the Ngāi Te Rangi tribe of Tauranga, also contributed to the population.

One of the earliest Whakatōhea ancestors, Tarawa, deliberately concealed his origins and claimed to have swum to the district from across the sea, supported by supernatural fish he called his pets or children (‘pōtiki’). Coming ashore just west of Ōpōtiki, he installed his pets into a spring, which thereby became imbued with his mana. The spring ‘o pōtiki mai tawhiti’ (‘of the children from faraway’) became famous, and the short form of the name later came to be applied to the district as a whole. Ōpōtiki therefore means (the place) of children.

Late eighteenth to early nineteenth century

The first contact between local Māori and Europeans was in 1769 when Captain James Cook passed down the Bay of Plenty coast. Early in the nineteenth century a few European and American traders and whalers began to visit.

The 1820s saw numerous well-armed invasions by Ngāpuhi war parties from Northland. Although the Ōpōtiki iwi had begun to acquire firearms by that time, they were outgunned and had to retreat from the coast to the rugged forested interior.

The 1830s to 1840s were more peaceful and the tribes again returned to the coast to take advantage of trading opportunities with trading and whaling ships. Māori Christian missionaries began to instruct in literacy and religion. In 1840 the Treaty of Waitangi was taken around to be signed, establishing British sovereignty in name at least. John  A Wilson a lay missionary of the Church Missionary Society established the Ōpōtiki mission in 1840. Soon after French missionaries moved into the area. At this period, the village at Ōpōtiki was known as Pā Kowhai. There were other important villages at Tunapāhore and Te Kaha.

The 1850s and early 1860s saw continued development. The Māori tribes took up European agricultural methods and crops, primarily wheat, pigs and peaches, which were traded with Auckland. There were still only a few Westerners living in the district, fewer still of whom were British by birth. Among these foreigners were Dr Albert Agassiz (1840–1910), distant cousin of the famous Swiss/American scientist Louis Agassiz, and Carl Völkner, a German missionary who had gone over to the Anglican Church.

Warfare
The British invasion of the Waikato resulted in the Whakatōhea iwi lending their support to anti-British forces. In 1864 a war party was sent to assist the related Ngāi Te Rangi tribe, who had defeated the British at Gate Pā, but while making their way along the coast the war party was attacked by combined British and Te Arawa forces. The paramount chief of the Whakatōhea, Te Aporotanga, was taken prisoner and then executed by the wife of an Arawa chief who had been killed in the battle. While this action was compatible with ancient Māori custom, the fighting had hitherto been conducted according to Christianised rules of engagement, and this was accordingly taken as a sign that the British were no longer to be considered as a civilised enemy.

In accordance with Māori custom, utu (revenge) was taken by killing the missionary Völkner, who had been recruited as an agent by the British Governor, Sir George Grey, and who had been transmitting secret reports. The so-called "Volkner Incident" resulted in the invasion of Ōpōtiki by British forces in 1865. Within a few years the Ōpōtiki district had been settled by military settlers, and the Maori tribes had been confined to villages with little land attached. A desultory guerilla war followed, led by Whakatōhea chief Hira te Popo and Tuhoe chief Eru Tamaikowha, but they eventually surrendered and were given amnesty.

Warfare again erupted in 1870 when the guerilla chief Te Kooti shifted his operations to the area. For a few years he and his followers lived in the rugged Te Wera area in the extreme southwest of the Ōpōtiki district. After an amnesty was granted he eventually moved to Ohiwa Harbour on the coast between Ōpōtiki and Whakatāne where he later died.

Recent history

When peace eventually came to the district, most of the cultivable land had been taken by British settlers and was converted to sheep and cattle (later dairy) farming. By the end of the nineteenth century a generation of both settlers and Māori had grown up together and there was some form of accommodation including intermarriage. The district lost men to the two World Wars, but an even greater blow was the Spanish flu pandemic of 1918–1919 which devastated small villages.

Because of the relatively small area of cultivable hinterland and a treacherous harbour entrance, early hopes of Ōpōtiki town becoming a major centre for the region were dashed. During the twentieth century the town suffered from repeated shifts of businesses and local government to Whakatāne, a situation which has only begun to reverse very recently with increasing population. Major floods in the 1950s and 1960s led to the protection of the town by levees (‘stopbanks’) which have successfully prevented any further inundations. A major boost to prosperity occurred with the kiwifruit boom of the late twentieth century. Mussel farming is the next project for develop the town alongside kiwifruit and bike riding in the Motu trail becoming popular with locals and tourists.

Iwi
Iwi based within the district are:
 Te Whakatōhea from Ohiwa Harbour to Opape, including Ōpōtiki township.
 Ngāitai are based in Tōrere.
 Te Whānau-ā-Apanui and hapu Te Ehutu cover the area from Hawai to Potaka.

Demographics

Ōpōtiki District had a population of 9,276 at the 2018 New Zealand census, an increase of 840 people (10.0%) since the 2013 census, and an increase of 303 people (3.4%) since the 2006 census. There were 3,222 households, comprising 4,563 males and 4,713 females, giving a sex ratio of 0.97 males per female. The median age was 40.6 years (compared with 37.4 years nationally), with 2,097 people (22.6%) aged under 15 years, 1,596 (17.2%) aged 15 to 29, 3,927 (42.3%) aged 30 to 64, and 1,659 (17.9%) aged 65 or older.

Ethnicities were 50.5% European/Pākehā, 63.7% Māori, 3.5% Pacific peoples, 2.8% Asian, and 1.0% other ethnicities. People may identify with more than one ethnicity.

The percentage of people born overseas was 8.2, compared with 27.1% nationally.

Although some people chose not to answer the census's question about religious affiliation, 42.1% had no religion, 32.2% were Christian, 16.6% had Māori religious beliefs, 0.3% were Hindu, 0.2% were Muslim, 0.4% were Buddhist and 1.5% had other religions.

Of those at least 15 years old, 789 (11.0%) people had a bachelor's or higher degree, and 1,944 (27.1%) people had no formal qualifications. The median income was $22,400, compared with $31,800 nationally. 549 people (7.6%) earned over $70,000 compared to 17.2% nationally. The employment status of those at least 15 was that 3,108 (43.3%) people were employed full-time, 1,041 (14.5%) were part-time, and 525 (7.3%) were unemployed.

Notes

References
 S. Beadel, C. Ecroyd, P. de Lange, P. Cashmore, W. Shaw & C. Crump, Checklist of Indigenous and Naturalised Vascular Plants in the Bay of Plenty, Rotorua Botanical Society, 2009, special issue #2.
 Judith Binney, Redemption Songs: a life of Te Kooti Arikirangi Te Turuki. Auckland University Press, 1995. .
 James Cowan, The New Zealand Wars, 1983 edition, NZ Govt Printer, vols 1 & 2.
 Rongowhakaata Halbert, Horouta, Reed Books, 1999. 
 M. Heginbotham & A.E. Esler, "Wild vascular plants of the Opotiki-East Cape region, North Island, New Zealand". NZ Journal of Botany, 1985, vol. 23: 379–406.
 Alfred C. Lyall, Whakatohea of Opotiki, AH & AW Reed, 1979. .
 W.J. Phillipps, The Book of the Huia, Whitcombe & Tombs, 1963.
 R.P. Suggate, G.R. Stevens & M.T. Te Punga (eds), The Geology of New Zealand, NZ Govt Printer, Wellington, 1978. Vol 2, .
 Ranginui Walker, Ōpōtiki-Mai-Tawhiti, Capital of Whakatōhea. Penguin, 2007. .

External links

Ōpōtiki District
Districts of New Zealand